89th NBR Awards
Best Film: 
The Post

The 89th National Board of Review Awards, honoring the best in film for 2017, were announced on November 28, 2017.

Top 10 Films
Films listed alphabetically except top, which is ranked as Best Film of the Year:

The Post
Baby Driver
Call Me by Your Name
The Disaster Artist
Downsizing
Dunkirk
The Florida Project
Get Out
Lady Bird
Logan
Phantom Thread

Top Foreign Films
Foxtrot
A Fantastic Woman
Frantz
Loveless
The Square
Summer 1993

Top Documentaries
Jane
Abacus: Small Enough to Jail
Brimstone & Glory
Eric Clapton: Life in 12 Bars
Faces Places
Hell on Earth: The Fall of Syria and the Rise of ISIS

Top Independent Films
Beatriz at Dinner
Brigsby Bear
A Ghost Story
Lady Macbeth
Logan Lucky
Loving Vincent
Menashe
Norman: The Moderate Rise and Tragic Fall of a New York Fixer
Patti Cake$
Wind River

Winners
Best Film:
The Post

Best Director:
Greta Gerwig, Lady Bird

Best Actor:
Tom Hanks, The Post

Best Actress:
Meryl Streep, The Post

Best Supporting Actor:
Willem Dafoe, The Florida Project

Best Supporting Actress:
Laurie Metcalf, Lady Bird

Best Original Screenplay:
Paul Thomas Anderson, Phantom Thread

Best Adapted Screenplay:
Scott Neustadter and Michael H. Weber, The Disaster Artist

Best Animated Feature:
Coco

Breakthrough Performance:
Timothée Chalamet, Call Me by Your Name

Best Directorial Debut:
Jordan Peele, Get Out

Best Foreign Language Film:
Foxtrot

Best Documentary:
Jane

Best Ensemble:
Get Out

Spotlight Award:
Wonder Woman, Patty Jenkins and Gal Gadot

NBR Freedom of Expression:
First They Killed My Father
Let It Fall: Los Angeles 1982–1992

References

National Board of Review Awards
2017 film awards
2017 in American cinema